[[File:The Royal Navy during the Second World War A3651.jpg|thumbnail|right|Mark IV Directors on HMS King George V. The large rectangular box centred above the director contains the gyro rate unit. This image was taken early in King George Vs career before the addition of Type 282 radar.]]"Pom-Pom" director''' was a director for British anti-aircraft guns on British warships of the 1930s into the Second World War.

Development
The Vickers 40 mm   QF 2 pounder "Pom-Pom" gun anti-aircraft mounting was introduced to the Royal Navy in the early 1930s. The multi-barrel mounting was capable of a tremendous volume of fire but the crew had great difficulty in aiming the mounting due to the smoke and vibration created by the guns. It was, therefore, essential to aim the mount from a remote location, using a director that had a clear view, free from smoke and vibration. The director crew would aim at the target aircraft and, in the early versions of the director, cause the layer (altitude) and trainer (azimuth) pointers to rotate on the gun mount. The gun crew would then move the mount to match the pointers rather than having to try and aim at the target aircraft.

Mark I - III directors

Directors I to III controlled the gun mounting through "follow the pointer" control and aimed at aircraft using eye shooting techniques through a simple ring sight. These directors began to appear on Royal Navy cruisers, battleships and aircraft carriers in 1930. They were universally fitted, one per pom-pom gun mounting, by the late 1930s. Most destroyers and smaller ships that carried 2-pounder guns continued to rely on aiming the guns with the on-mount gunsights due to the lack of space on these ships to site a director.

Director Mark IV

Later versions of the Mk IV director introduced remote power control (RPC) and could control the gun mounting by remote control from the director. The Mk IV director was fully tachymetric, but performance suffered as the director was not stabilized against the movement of the ship. It consequently required a carefully trained crew (a total of eight including the radar operator in the radar office) to achieve good results. Later versions were upgraded with Type 282 radar and RPC beginning in 1941, with HMS Prince of Wales being one of the first ships to receive the radar upgrade, which she first used in action during Operation Halberd.

See also

 List of anti-aircraft guns
Notes and references

External links

 The Pom-Pom Director, Mark IV in The Gunnery Pocket Book'', B.R. 224/45, 1945 placed online courtesy of Historic Naval Ships Association
 Illustration of the Pom-Pom Director, Mark IV in The Gunnery Pocket Book, B.R. 224/45, 1945 placed online courtesy of Historic Naval Ships Association

Artillery operation
Naval guns of the United Kingdom
Military computers
Fire-control computers of World War II

de:Ordnance QF 2-Pfünder-Marinegeschütz
it:2 libbre navale
ja:ポンポン砲
pl:Armata przeciwlotnicza 40 mm Mark VIII